Brezovljani  is a village in Croatia.

References

Populated places in Koprivnica-Križevci County